Soul Temptation is the fifth album by the German power metal band Brainstorm, released in 2003. The album was also published in a double digipack limited edition, which features the bonus track "Amarillo" and a bonus DVD called Live Suffering, recorded live at the Summer Breeze Open Air Festival of 2002.

Track listing 
All songs written & arranged by Brainstorm, all lyrics by Andy B. Franck.

 "Highs Without Lows"  – 5:28 
 "Doorway to Survive"  – 3:22
 "The Leading"  – 5:39
 "Nunca Nos Rendimos"  – 5:41 
 "Fading"  – 5:31
 "Shiva's Tears"  – 5:32
 "Fornever"  – 4:55 
 "Soul Temptation"  – 7:48
 "Dying Outside"  – 4:08 
 "To the Head"  – 4:37 
 "Rising"  – 5:08

 Tracks 6-8 form the "Trinity of Lust" trilogy.

Personnel
Band members
Andy B. Franck - lead and backing vocals
Torsten Ihlenfeld - guitars, backing vocals, engineer
Milan Loncaric - guitars and backing vocals, engineer
Andreas Mailänder - bass
Dieter Bernert - drums

Additional musicians
Michael 'Miro' Rodenberg - keyboards, engineer

Production
Achim Köhler - producer, engineer, mixing, mastering
Ingmar Schelzel - engineer

References

2003 albums
Brainstorm (German band) albums
Metal Blade Records albums